Ross Ibbotson Dalton Mallam (1878 – 26 May 1954), invariably known as R. I. D. Mallam or Justice Mallam, was a judge of the Northern Territory Supreme Court.

History
Mallam was born in Kensington, London, and in 1902 emigrated to Adelaide, South Australia, where his uncle George Bessant Mallam (1843–1910) was a successful medical practitioner who had in 1884 married Annie Isabel Kyffin Thomas (1864–1948), daughter of the influential newspaper proprietor William Kyffin Thomas (1821–1878).

He began practising law in Kadina in 1903, then a year later in Adelaide, where he also served as managing clerk for Paris Nesbit. On a motion by Nesbit, Mallam was admitted as a practitioner to the Supreme Court of South Australia.

In 1910 he moved to Darwin where he had a successful practice in Mitchell Street, having taken over the offices of E. P. G. Little.

He was appointed to the N.T. Supreme Court in 1928, replacing Judge Roberts.

He retired in 1933; the vacant position on the Supreme Court was filled by Thomas Alexander Wells (c. 1888–1954). After a year in Adelaide moved to Melbourne, where he died in 1954.

Recognition
Mallam Street, Ludmilla is named for him.
as is Mallam Crescent Alice Springs.

References 

1878 births
1954 deaths
History of the Northern Territory
Judges of the Supreme Court of the Northern Territory
British emigrants to Australia